Saxicolella marginalis is a species of plant in the family Podostemaceae. It is found in Cameroon and Nigeria. Its natural habitat is rivers.

References

Podostemaceae
Critically endangered plants
Taxonomy articles created by Polbot